This is a complete list of 147 stations of the TransMilenio (143 at Bogotá and 4 at Soacha), Colombia

The stations are distributed according to the zones implemented April 29, 2006.

Caracas 
(From south to north)

 A Tercer Milenio
 A Avenida Jiménez
 A Calle 19
 A Calle 22
 A Calle 26
 A Calle 34
 A Avenida 39
 A Calle 45
 A Marly
 A Calle 57
 A Calle 63
 A Flores
 A Calle 72
 A Calle 76

Autonorte 
(From north to south)

 B Terminal
 B Calle 187
 B Portal del Norte
 B Toberín
 B Calle 161
 B Mazurén
 B Calle 146
 B Calle 142
 B Alcalá
 B Prado
 B Calle 127
 B Pepe Sierra
 B Calle 106
 B Calle 100
 B Virrey
 B Calle 85
 B Héroes

Suba 
(From west to east)

 C Portal de Suba
 C La Campiña
 C Av. Suba - Tv. 91
 C 21 Ángeles
 C Gratamira
 C Av. Suba - Av. Boyacá
 C Niza - Calle 127
 C Humedal Córdoba
 C Av. Suba - Calle 116
 C Puente Largo
 C Av. Suba - Calle 100
 C Av. Suba - Calle 95
 C Rionegro
 C San Martín

Calle 80 
(From west to east)

 D Portal de la 80
 D Quirigua
 D Carrera 90
 D Avenida Cali
 D Granja -Carrera 77
 D Minuto de Dios
 D Boyacá
 D Ferias
 D Avenida 68
 D Carrera 53
 D Carrera 47
 D Escuela Militar
 D Polo

NQS Central 
(From west to east)
 E Tygua - San José
 E Guatoque - Veraguas
(From south to north)

 E Ricaurte
 E Paloquemao
 E CAD
 E Avenida El Dorado
 E Universidad Nacional de Colombia
 E El Campín
 E Movistar Arena
 E Simón Bolívar
 E Avenida Chile
 E NQS Calle 75
 E La Castellana

Las Américas 
(From west to east)

 F Portal de Las Américas
 F Patio Bonito
 F Biblioteca Tintal
 F Transversal 86
 F Banderas
 F Mandalay
 F Américas–Avenida Boyacá
 F Marsella
 F Pradera
 F Distrito Grafiti
 F Puente Aranda
 F Carrera 43
 F Zona Industrial
 F CDS Carrera 32
 F Ricaurte
 F San Façon Carrera 22
 F De La Sabana

NQS Sur 
(From south to north)

 G San Mateo
 G Terreros
 G León XIII
 G La Despensa
 G Bosa
 G Portal del Sur
 G Perdomo
 G Centro Comercial Paseo Villa del Río - Madelena
 G Sevillana
 G Venecia
 G Alquería
 G General Santander
 G NQS Calle 38 A Sur
 G NQS Calle 30 Sur
 G SENA
 G Santa Isabel
 G Comuneros

Caracas Sur 
(From south to north)

 H Portal de Usme
 H Molinos
 H Consuelo
 H Socorro
 H Santa Lucía
 H Calle 40 Sur
 H Quiroga
 H Olaya
 H Restrepo
 H Fucha
 H Nariño
 H Hortúa
 H Hospital

Caracas Sur (Ramal del Tunal) 

(From west to east)
 H Portal del Tunal
 H Parque
 H Biblioteca

Eje Ambiental 
(From east to west)
 J Las Aguas
 J Museo del Oro
 J Universidades

Avenida El Dorado 

(From west to east)
 K Portal ElDorado
 K Modelia
 K Normandía
 K Av. Rojas
 K El Tiempo - Maloka
 K Salitre Greco
 K CAN
 K Gobernación
 K Quinta Paredes
 K Recinto Ferial
 K Ciudad Universitaria
 K Concejo de Bogotá
 K Centro Memoria
 K Estación Central

Carrera 10 
(From south to north)

 L Portal 20 de Julio
 L Country Sur
 L Av. 1 de Mayo
 L Ciudad Jardín
 L Policarpa
 L San Bernando
 L Bicentenario
 L San Victorino
 L Las Nieves
 L San Diego

Carrera Séptima 
(From south to north)
 M Museo Nacional

See also 
 Bogotá
 TransMilenio

External links 
 TransMilenio
 suRumbo.com
 Unofficial Route Map at Google Earth (Not 100% complete)
 Unofficial Route Map at Google Maps (Not 100% complete) - not able to see street names
 Unofficial map of stations at Google Maps - able to see street names

Transport in Bogotá
TransMilenio